The 81st Indianapolis 500 was held at the Indianapolis Motor Speedway in Speedway, Indiana over three days, May 25–27, 1997. It was originally scheduled for Sunday May 25, however, rain washed out all activities for the day. The race was started on Monday May 26, but rain halted the race after only 15 laps had been completed. On Tuesday May 27, the race was resumed, and was run to completion. The rain delay, as well as two controversies (one during time trials, and one during the race), put a damper on the month. Arie Luyendyk won the race from the pole position, his second Indy victory. Treadway Racing, in only their second season of competition, finished 1st-2nd with Luyendyk and teammate Scott Goodyear. The team became the first to sweep the top two finishing position at Indianapolis since Leader Cards in 1962.

It was the second Indianapolis 500 held as part of the USAC-sanctioned Indy Racing League, and was part of the 1996-97 Indy Racing League season. It marked the introduction of a new production-based, normally aspirated engine formula as well as a new chassis design. The new engine formula resulted in a substantial drop in speeds compared to the previous year, and the chassis were noticeably different in many aspects - both visually, and mechanically.

A controversy during qualifying saw two bumped cars re-added to the starting field after the close of time trials, thus the starting grid was made up of 35 cars. It was the first time since 1979, and only the second time since 1933 that more than the traditional 33 cars comprised the starting grid. While the field had been expanded, a crash during the pace lap eliminated three cars. Two additional cars failed to start the race due to mechanical problems, and only 29 cars took the green flag.

With two laps to go in the race, polesitter Arie Luyendyk led teammate Scott Goodyear. A caution came out on the 199th lap after Tony Stewart brushed the turn four wall. The pace car did not come out to pack-up the field. Drivers and crews expected the race would finish under the caution. Without warning, the green and white flag were displayed at the starter's stand on the final lap, signifying the track was back to racing conditions. None of the cars in the field were prepared for the restart, and yellow lights around the course remained illuminated for many seconds afterwards. Luyendyk held on to win, but controversy erupted regarding the officials' poor handling of the situation. This last-lap incident, followed by a major scoring snafu two weeks later at Texas, led to the USAC being permanently removed from sanctioning the IRL and Indy 500, in favor of in-house officiating.

The win by Arie Luyendyk marked the milestone 50th Indianapolis 500 victory for Firestone. It was Luyendyk's second Indy victory (he also won in 1990), as well as Scott Goodyear's second runner-up finish (1992). It was the third time in his career that Goodyear narrowly lost the Indy 500 in the closing stages. Luyendyk became the first driver since A. J. Foyt to win the race with both a turbocharged and a normally-aspirated engine.

Race schedule
The 1997 race utilized the traditional three week / four weekend schedule that had been in use since the mid-1970s. Practice started on the Saturday 22 days prior to the race, and four days of time trials were utilized. With changes to the schedule in subsequent years, 1997 would be the final year that used the 23-day month of May schedule. It was also the final year that used the traditional 
four days of time trials, along with the original four-day qualifying format that had dated back to 1952.

A few days before the race, a fire swept through the storage hangar housing the floats for the 500 Festival Parade, and threatened to cancel the parade scheduled for Saturday May 24 downtown. Only four floats were spared, and Buddy Lazier's 1996 winning car escaped the fire only because the museum had decided to wait a few extra days before delivering it to the float staging area. The parade went on as scheduled, but in a slightly retooled format.

Background

New engine and chassis package
New engines and new cars arrived at the Indianapolis Motor Speedway for 1997. In 1996, it was announced that all races of the Indy Racing League would switch to a normally aspirated production-based formula starting in January 1997. In addition, a new contingent of chassis rules accompanied the powerplants. All engines for 1997 would be 4.0 L, 32-valve production-based engines. There would be two manufacturers involved, Oldsmobile Aurora (L47) and Nissan Infiniti (VH). The chassis were constructed by Dallara and G-Force. Riley & Scott also was selected as a chassis manufacturer, but they were not yet ready for competition.

The changes were in the interest of cutting costs, lowering speeds, and bringing the racing closer together. After setting an all-time track record of over 237 mph a year earlier, Arie Luyendyk's top lap for qualifying in 1997 would drop to 217 mph. The new chassis had many visible differences, most noticeably the airbox above the engine cowling, larger wings, taller sidepods, and an overall bulkier appearance. The new cars produced more downforce than the previous machines, changing the driving characteristics.

With turbochargers legislated out of the series, the 1997 race was the first since the early 1960s to feature a full field of piston-powered, normally aspirated powerplants. The new crossplane crankshaft  engines were also much louder than their turbocharged, flat-plane crank counterparts, leading some fans and media to compare them to sound of NASCAR engines.

Track changes
The track was repaved in the fall of 1995. Following the 1996 Brickyard 400, the apexes of the four turns were breaking up. Over the offseason, track crews repaved the apexes of the turns with a different compound of asphalt. The result was a better surface, but a visibly darker area in the apexes of all four turns.

Continuing split from CART
The ongoing IRL/CART split continued into its second year. No major teams from the CART ranks entered at Indianapolis. With the new IRL chassis and engine rules for 1997, the two series now had substantially different and incompatible equipment. CART-based teams that wished to enter the Indy 500 would henceforth be required to purchase all new cars and engines, and few if any had the interest or the budget to do so. The alternative U.S. 500, however, was cancelled after only one running. Instead of running another race the same day as the Indy 500, CART teams participated in the Motorola 300 at the newly opened Gateway International Raceway on Saturday May 24, the day before the Indy 500 was scheduled.

The only former CART-based team that raced at Indy in 1997 was Galles Racing, which during the offseason had decided to switch full-time to the IRL. Robby Gordon, a CART regular from 1992 to 1996, had switched his full-time focus to NASCAR for 1997, driving for Felix Sabates. Sabates arranged for Gordon to race "Double Duty", planning to race at Indy and the Coca-Cola 600 in the same day. The effort was well-funded, and received considerable media attention. Gordon and Scott Goodyear, who had switched to full-time IRL competition, became the first drivers to come back to the Speedway among the 22 starters from 1995 that had not entered the 1996 event.

On April 11, during a public meeting, Indy Racing League's executive director Leo Mehl stated that CART had pressured in previous years to reduce the Indianapolis 500 to a three-day race, and emphasized that "is a myth that the other side has all the top drivers and you don't have to look very far back into recent history to see a demonstration of that myth. IRL has plenty of top stars to showcase once the press ends its infatuation with propagating opinion instead of facts". Mehl also quoted the creation of the IRL as "necessary", because of stagnant television ratings, NASCAR's rise and the increasing flux of grassroots open wheel drivers into stock car racing.

1996–97 IRL season

For its first season, the IRL schedule was situated such that the Indianapolis 500 would be the final race of the season. That provided that the IRL champion would be crowned at the conclusion of the Indianapolis 500 - and could possibly even be the Indy 500 winner. The arrangement proved unusual, and ultimately disruptive. The second season of the IRL, referred to as the 1996–97 season, was originally scheduled to begin at Loudon in August 1996, and conclude with the 1997 Indy 500 in May 1997.

In October 1996, league officials announced that the series would revert to a traditional calendar-based season. To aid the transition, the 1996–97 season would include the two races run in late 1996, and all races run in the calendar year of 1997. The Indianapolis 500 would no longer serve as the season finale.

25/8 Rule and locked-in entries

For the second year in a row, 25 (of 33) starting grid positions for the Indianapolis 500 were set aside for the top 25 cars in 1996-97 season IRL points standings. Known as the "25/8 Rule", the controversial arrangement was introduced during the 1996 IRL season and had been a key issue that led the CART teams to boycott the 1996 race. IRL officials, however, stated that the rule had already served its purpose of guaranteeing a starting field for other races on the IRL schedule, leaving the door open for its eventual demise in 1998.

The format (similar in practice to NASCAR's Top 35 rule introduced years later) provided that the top 25 entries in owner points (not drivers) were guaranteed a "locked-in" starting position, and could not be bumped, provided they completed a four-lap qualifying run over a minimum prescribed speed. Officials set 203 mph as the minimum. The grid would still be arranged by speed rank. The remaining eight positions would be filled by non-top 25 entries, and bumping could only occur among those eight positions and the non-top 25 participants.

The #15 and the #74 entries, both raced at the first two races of the 1996-97 season, never appeared during the month of May. Della Penna Motorsports had left the Indy Racing League at the end of calendar year 1996 to compete in CART, while Tempero-Giuffre Racing stayed away from the track despite entering an Infiniti-powered G-Force. Therefore, only 23 of the 25 eligible "locked-in" entries were present to accept their berth, and ten at-large starting positions were up for grabs at the onset of qualifying.

The entry list was published on April 21. The 22 cars that had run the first two rounds of the 1997 year were entered, including the #17 Chitwood Motorsports entry, with Affonso Giaffone having been confirmed for the rest of the season, and the #30 McCormack Motorsports car, initially unassigned as Jeret Schroeder hadn't yet struck a financial deal with the team. Out of those 22 cars, only the #16 (Blueprint Racing) and the #50 (EuroInternational) were at-large entries.

Apart from Robby Gordon's entry, eight further driver/car combinations were registered: Eliseo Salazar, back in his full-time ride with Team Scandia, and Lyn St. James were making comeback bids from their injuries, as well as Alessandro Zampedri, who was confirmed back in December and would also stay on Scandia afterwards. Jeff Ward was signed to drive for Team Cheever's second entry on April 10, while the release of the entry list confirmed the participation of two Indy car debutants: Vincenzo Sospiri, the 1995 Formula 3000 champion and brief Formula 1 driver for the failed MasterCard Lola team, and Greg Ray, third in the 1994 Atlantic Championship and 12th in the previous Indy Lights season. Ray was run by Knapp Motorsports, a spin-off team of the Genoa Racing outfit that was competing in Indy Lights.

Besides, Tyce Carlson was entered by PDM Racing in their second car, and Gary Bettenhausen was announced as the driver of the #81 car, an at-large entry fielded by newcomers Terhune-Barnets Racing and run by LP Racing, in an attempt to make his 22nd Indy 500 start. However, on April 25 he was replaced on the entry list by Mark Dismore, backed by Kelley Automotive Group, who had placed orders on the yet-to-be-delivered chassis from Riley & Scott the previous year. The team also parted ways with LP Racing and his crew chief Larry Nash, and made a deal with PDM Racing to run the car as his second entry, the #28, which had a locked-in berth. This move left Tyce Carlson out of the ride. Tom Kelley became the owner of the car by the time practice had begun and the deal with PDM lasted through the season, after which Kelley Racing would become a fully independent entity in 1998. Stefan Johansson originally planned to race in his own entry, but he gave up early in the year due to lingering effects from a crash at Laguna Seca in the last race of the 1996 Indy Car season. Scott Harrington was entered as his driver in late April.

Locked-in entries

 Former winner 
 Indy 500 Rookie

  Entered on Bump Day.  Scott Sharp, the entry's original driver, was injured in a crash on May 9. Johnny O'Connell, entered on May 13, was also injured in a crash on May 16.
  Entered on May 13.  John Paul Jr., the entry's original driver, was injured in a crash on May 9.
  Entered on May 11.

At-large entries

 Indy 500 Rookie

  Entered on May 10.
  Entered on May 9.
  Entered on May 6.
  Entered on May 15.

Practice (week 1)

Saturday May 3 - Opening Day
The first day of practice, set aside for Rookie Orientation, was rained out.

Sunday May 4 - Rookie Orientation
The first day of track activity saw six rookies take laps, with Vincenzo Sospiri leading the speed chart at 211.964 mph. Jack Miller blew an engine, in what was the only remarkable incident of the day. Robbie Groff also took laps for McCormack Motorsports, as the former Indy Lights driver, with two CART races under his belt back in 1994, had struck a deal to drive with the team, in detriment of Jeret Schroeder.

In a press conference, Team Menard confirmed that Tony Stewart would continue with the team for the remainder of the  1996-97 season year and for 1998. The lengthening of the season, devised to switch to a calendar schedule for 1998, meant a new deal had to be reached in order for Stewart to finalize his NASCAR Busch Series outings. Stewart had already signed a full-season deal with Joe Gibbs Racing for 1998, and had his sights in a Winston Cup ride for 1999. Menard also confirmed a switch from Firestone to Goodyear tires.

Monday May 5 - Rookie Orientation
A very windy day saw minimal activity, with only four cars taking a total of 80 laps before rain closed the track at 4:30 p.m. Kenny Bräck turned the fastest lap at 205.597 mph.

Tuesday May 6
The first full day of practice saw heavy activity. Arie Luyendyk set the fastest lap thus far of the month at 5:24 p.m., at 218.707 mph. The only incident of the day occurred early on, when rookie Jeff Ward blew an engine and spun into the wall in turn 3.

Later on, five rookies (Kenny Bräck, Robbie Groff, Greg Ray, Vincenzo Sospiri and Affonso Giaffone) completed their rookie test, and Sinden Racing Services confirmed that Steve Kinser, a 14-times World of Outlaws sprint car champion, would drive their #44 at-large entry. Kinser had tried to qualify for the race 15 years earlier, when a practice crash ended his chances in 1981, and had never competed in an Indy car race.

John Andretti, a seven times-Indianapolis 500 starter between 1988 and 1994, passed the mandatory physical exam. Andretti, who switched to NASCAR Winston Cup in 1994 and was driving for Cale Yarborough Motorsports, had expressed an interest in doing the Double Duty for the second time.

Wednesday May 7
Arie Luyendyk became the first and only driver to go over 220 mph during the month, with a lap of 220.297 mph. At 4:12 p.m., Scott Sharp crashed in turn 1, heavily damaging his primary car. He had just run a lap of 217.402 mph.

Lyn St. James's 34 laps were her first on a race car since her collision at the previous year's Indy 500, as her broken right wrist had healed improperly. Rain closed the track about 10 minutes early.

Thursday May 8
Rain kept the track closed until 3 p.m., and the final three hours saw average activity, including the first laps for Steve Kinser and Stéphan Grégoire. Just minutes after the track opened, Arie Luyendyk spun in the southchute, and tagged the wall, suffering minor nose cone damage. He was uninjured. Later, Luyendyk returned to the track, and once again, led the speed chart at 217.318 mph.

In the later stages of the day, Alessandro Zampedri's car caught fire, having blown an engine coming out of Turn 4. After struggling to compete for the top spots during two days of practice with Goodyear tires, Team Menard switched back to mounting compounds from Firestone. Right away, Tony Stewart and Robbie Buhl were able to challenge Luyendyk's lap times, ending the session just behind him.

"Fast" Friday May 9
The final day of practice before pole qualifying saw heavy action, and cool temperatures. The speed chart was competitive, with Arie Luyendyk, Tony Stewart, and Robbie Buhl trading fast lap for the afternoon. At the end of the day, Luyendyk was fastest, sweeping the chart all four days of veteran practice. His lap of 218.325 mph was a mile per hour faster than Stewart in second place.

Two incidents, however, overshadowed the action. At 12:42 p.m., John Paul Jr. crashed in Turn 4, and suffered a broken lower right leg and a broken left heel. With 43 minutes left, Scott Sharp also crashed exiting Turn 4, and suffered a concussion. Sharp had been knocked unconscious in the crash with his foot on the throttle, and the destroyed car kept going for a while in the front stretch alongside the outside wall with its wheels spinning. Both Paul and Sharp would be forced to sit out the rest of the month. In another incident, Stéphan Grégoire's car suffered minor damage against the inside guard rail after a spin in the warm-up lane.

During the day, Jack Miller, Steve Kinser and Sam Schmidt passed the final phases of their rookie tests, Jeff Ward completed his 20-lap refresher test, and driver-owner Eddie Cheever turned his first laps of the month, having concentrated so far in getting Ward's car up to speed. EuroInternational also completed their first laps with Billy Roe, albeit at a slow speed. With them, 30 of the 32 confirmed car-driver combinations had taken to the track before Pole Day qualifying, the exceptions being Mark Dismore due to the lateness of the ownership and crew switch in the #28 entry, and Scott Harrington, as Johansson Motorsports saw its Oldsmobile engine deal being scuppered.

Besides Harrington, some Oldsmobile entries were experiencing engine shortages. After Jim Guthrie had a timing chain failure, Blueprint Racing was left with no powerplants available, as the three engines they had put a deposit on had not been delivered. Team Menard refused to supply them, having previously committed to Steve Kinser for technical assistance. Other Aurora-supplied teams also faced similar issues, like Team Scandia, which was switching their few engines between their entries.

Time trials (weekend 1)

Pole Day - Saturday May 10
Pole day time trials took place under mostly sunny skies, but cool temperatures, which forced the Pole Day morning practice to be delayed due to low track temperature for the first time in history. Tony Stewart led the charts at 219.085 mph.

After two days of on-truck struggles in the 209 mph range, Hemelgarn Racing announced Saturday morning that Buddy Lazier would use Oldsmobile powerplants instead of Infiniti's, citing a lack of speed and sponsor deference. Due to contractual obligations on fielding a second Infiniti engine, the team entered Johnny Unser to drive in Lazier's car, renumbered as #90, while Lazier would qualify with his back-up. Because of the shortages being faced from Oldsmobile, their first Aurora engine was loaned by driver-owner Stan Wattles, whose upstart operation Metro Racing Systems was yet in the planning process.

The first car out on the track to qualify was Mike Groff. He became the first driver to complete a run in a normally aspirated car since 1987, and the first to qualify one since 1984. His speed also tentatively broke existing normally aspirated, stock block, track records with an average of 208.537 mph. A total of nine cars went out for runs during the first segment, however, only five were run to completion. Jeff Ward sat on the provisional pole at 214.517 mph, which would eventually be good for seventh on the grid.

Shortly after 3 p.m., Arie Luyendyk took to the track, and began the second wave of qualifiers. His run of 218.263 mph put him firmly on the pole position, with Tony Stewart close behind at 218.021 mph. Rookie Vincenzo Sospiri surprised many by rounding out the front row at 216.822 mph, beating Robbie Buhl, who qualified on his third attempt, Scott Goodyear and Jim Guthrie, who was on a popularity peak after his surprise Phoenix 200 win and had run competitively during the week. Guthrie had been able to qualify after a long overnight rebuild of his lone engine. 

With his new engine, Buddy Lazier substantially improved his pace to qualify in the top 10. There were several wave offs during qualifying attempts, and three drivers didn't got to complete theirs. Robbie Groff brushed the wall at the exit of Turn 1 in his second lap and had to wave off, Fermín Vélez blew an engine during his second lap, and Sam Schmidt spun on the warm-up lane, hitting the inside wall. Also, Eliseo Salazar had to wave off his first qualifying attempt after hitting a bird on Lap 3.

At the end of pole day, 21 cars were in the field, with Roberto Guerrero slowest thus far at just over 207 mph. The Colombian qualified with his back-up car, which left him without his locked-in status, but John Barnes, Pagan's team manager, had petitioned for it to become the primary car while the car was already in the qualifying lane. The change was not made before Guerrero took to the track, but USAC allowed it to be considered as a primary car the following day, securing Guerrero's place in the grid. That decision put Alessandro Zampedri in an early bubble among the at-large entries, having qualified at barely 209 mph. A week later, during Bump Day, USAC allowed a similar change to Buddy Lazier's car at the request of Ron Hemelgarn, despite being safely in the field at 214.286 mph.

  Qualified as an at-large entry, before his status was reversed.
  Bumped from the field by other at-large entries on Bump Day.

Second Day - Sunday May 11
With the majority of occupied cars having qualified on Saturday, only four machines started qualifying attempts on the second day. Two of them were added to the field; Steve Kinser completed a run early in the day, while Robbie Groff finished just before the track closed in his last attempt. The first one was nullified by an engine misfire, and the second, by a cold track surface. Greg Ray, in an at-large entry, was set for a 215 mph qualifying run before he ran out of fuel in his last lap. The priority in engine usage at Team Scandia forced Marco Greco to become the only available first-week competitor to sit out during Pole Day weekend.

In the morning, Dennis Vitolo was assigned to the #54 Beck Motorsports entry, which had a locked-in berth after being raced by Robbie Buhl in the last two rounds of 1996. Billy Boat, who failed to qualify in 1996 and was yet to debut in an Indy car race, had been recruited on Friday to drive Foyt's third car, and took to the track for the first time in the #1T car. Boat even took warm up laps for a tentative late qualifying attempt, with the only purpose of checking some changes to the car. Despite this, his deal had been agreed before Sharp's injury, and he was not slated to replace him.

Practice (week 2)

Monday May 12
Another cool and windy day saw 18 cars practice. Arie Luyendyk continued his dominance, and led the practice chart for already-qualified drivers. Billy Boat, who failed to qualify in 1996 and was yet to debut in an Indy car race, had been recruited the week prior to drive Foyt's third car, and took to the track for the first time to complete his refresher test, while Billy Roe became the ninth driver to pass his rookie test.

Off the track, A. J. Foyt announced that he was working on a deal for John Andretti to replace the injured Scott Sharp in the #1 entry, providing that travel and scheduling constraints were arranged with his team owner Cale Yarborough. Johansson Motorsports confirmed they would use an Infiniti engine provided by Hemelgarn Racing, after plans to run an Oldsmobile engine for their driver Scott Harrington fell through.

Tuesday May 13
Arie Luyendyk sat out practice for the day, and would not come back on track until Bump Day practice, which he would also led. Ten drivers turned their fastest laps of the month, including Buddy Lazier, who led the speed chart, and Billy Boat, the fastest of the non-qualified cars at over 214 mph, 4 miles per hour faster than the others, including Dennis Vitolo, who blew an engine before getting up to speed.

A. J. Foyt conceded defeat in his intentions to bring John Andretti as a driver, as his NASCAR commitment with Cale Yarborough would not provide enough travel time to make it to the Coca-Cola 600. Johnny O'Connell was named to replace Scott Sharp in the #1 car, and PDM Racing confirmed Tyce Carlson to replace the injured John Paul Jr. in the #18 car. Carlson had run two races with the team in 1996, and had intended to make the Indy 500 in the #28 until Mark Dismore's deal was arranged in late April.

Wednesday May 14
Buddy Lazier and Billy Boat repeated their efforts from the previous day, as the fastest already-qualified, and fastest non-qualified cars of the day. High winds blew debris onto the track causing several yellow lights throughout the afternoon.

Thursday May 15
Most of the cars that took to the track were among those not yet qualified. Several veterans sat out the afternoon. Sam Schmidt found his way to the top of the speed chart, at over 211 mph. His team, Blueprint Racing, confirmed a third entry for Claude Bourbonnais, the 1993 Atlantic Championship runner-up and fourth in the 1996 Indy Lights season, who had run five CART races in 1994. Bourbonnais was due to take over Jim Guthrie's back-up car.

Like the Canadian, Johnny Unser and Johnny O'Connell run laps over 200 mph, also taking to the track for the first time all month, as well as Mark Dismore and his new teammate Tyce Carlson, who passed his refresher test. In a windy day, both drivers got to do laps in the 210 mph range early in the day before parking the cars early, as PDM Racing was out of spare engines.

Friday May 16
The final full day of practice saw heavy activity among qualified and non-qualified drivers. With Arie Luyendyk still absent, Tony Stewart led the speed chart. During the first hour, Johnny O'Connell lost an engine and crashed hard in the southchute. He dislocated his left foot, becoming the second Foyt driver to be sidelined during the month. Later that afternoon, Claude Bourbonnais was the tenth and last driver to complete his rookie test, and Scott Harrington finally took his first laps of the month. 

Among the un-qualified cars, both Greg Ray and Fermín Vélez went back on-track for the first time since Pole Day weekend. Meanwhile, the three already qualified drivers from Team Scandia sat out the whole week of practice because of the lingering engine parts shortages, including Alessandro Zampedri despite his bubble spot. This reduced running for both Marco Greco and Vélez to a combined 47 laps. Similar issues also kept Jim Guthrie out of the track during the week. Up to six locked-in entries were yet to qualify, and the remaining seven un-qualified cars were set to battle on time trials, as well as the slower at-large qualifiers of Pole Day weekend (Steve Kinser, Lyn St. James and Zampedri), as four open spots were still up for grabs.

In news off the track, the Indy Racing League confirmed the technical specifications for 1998 and beyond, which included the elimination of the 25/8 Rule, that had grown in controversy beyond its implied CART-blocking purposes. During the week, competitors and officials alike were growing apprehensive of the rule, as it was becoming increasingly possible that by enforcing the rule, the "fastest 33 cars", a cornerstone Indy tradition, would not necessarily make the field: at-large entries were expected to have to go at least over 210 mph to make the race, while four locked-in entries had settled with qualifying just over the 203 mph minimum speed required. Also, there had been some disconformity with some teams selling, or trying to sell, their locked-in berths.

Time trials (weekend 2)

Third Day - Saturday May 17
The third day of qualifying saw sunny skies and warm temperatures. A busy day of time trials saw the field fill to 31 cars. Billy Boat set the early pace with an average of 215.544 mph, sixth fastest on the whole grid and faster than team leader Davey Hamilton. Several "locked-in" drivers took runs, and within an hour, eight consecutive time trials were run to completion, including another 215 mph run by Sam Schmidt which closely mirrored that of the sister car of Jim Guthrie. Johnny Unser couldn't try to qualify after a piston failed in the morning practice, Greg Ray suffered an engine failure during his warm-up lap and Claude Bourbonnais, looking for speed to qualify on the later stages of the day, damaged his car after tagging the wall twice.

When the track closed for the day, only two positions were unfilled. 22 of the 23 original "locked-in" entries were already in the field. The only original "locked-in" entry yet unqualified was the #1 of A. J. Foyt Enterprises. After the injuries suffered by Scott Sharp and Johnny O'Connell, the car had no driver currently named. Foyt had previously discarded using that berth for Boat  and told reporters he would not sign another replacement driver,  reducing the number of cars yet to qualify on Bump Day to just four.

Bump Day - Sunday May 18
Going into the final day of qualifying, two positions were open. One final "locked-in" position was available (Foyt's #1), as 22 of the 23 eligible cars had already completed their runs. Once the field was filled to 33 cars, the ten "non-exempt" positions were all up for grabs among the at-large entries. On the morning of Bump Day qualifying, several non-exempt teams were uneasy about their chances of making the field, despite having speeds amongst the fastest 33. Despite saying earlier that he was not going to run the #1 car, Foyt sent team driver Davey Hamilton out to shake the car down.

In the first fifteen minutes of qualifying, the at-large entries of Johnny Unser (209.344 mph) and Greg Ray (213.760 mph) filled the field to 33 cars. Since 22 of the cars were locked-in, the move put Alessandro Zampedri on the bubble. Zampedri had qualified 19th on pole day with a 209.09 mph, and was the 28th-fastest car in the field at the time, but those five slower cars were "locked-in".

At 12:17 p.m., Paul Durant climbed for the first time into the #1 Foyt car, the final entry eligible for a locked-in position. Durant had secured the ride at 11:30 a.m., and those were his first laps of the entire month. By 1:09 p.m., he was safely in the field at 209.149 mph, bumping Zampedri from the field of 33. Durant's only previous IRL experience consisted of two early retirements in 1996.

Johnny Unser was now on the bubble. His qualifying speed of 209.344 mph was the 26th-fastest car in the field, but as the slowest at-large entry, he was first in line to be ousted. At 2:08 p.m., Claude Bourbonnais took to the track for a qualifying attempt. His speed of 210.523 mph easily bumped out Unser, and put Lyn St. James on the bubble. She had qualified 16th on pole day, and her speed of 210.145 mph was the 25th-fastest overall in the field, as well as the fastest by an Infiniti-powered car. But as an at-large entry, the eight cars below St. James were all locked-in.

Immediately after Bourbonnais's attempt, and with rain approaching, Alessandro Zampedri took to the track in his back-up car. His run of 211.757 mph was enough to bump Lyn St. James, and subsequently put Bourbonnais on the bubble. Minutes later, rain started falling and closed the track for the next hour. Despite being bumped, Hemelgarn Racing (the team for both Unser and St. James) were making no effort to bring their cars back out on the track to re-qualify. According to Lyn St. James, she confronted IRL official Leo Mehl about the situation, but received an inattentive response. She also pleaded with car owner Ron Hemelgarn, who himself appeared curiously unconcerned. Rumors had already begun circulating around the garage area that USAC officials were considering reinstating bumped cars to the field.

The track was dried and re-opened at 3:15 p.m. Scott Harrington was the lone car preparing to qualify. Having been unable to go over 200 mph during practice on Saturday, Johansson Motorsports took possession of a Foyt back-up chassis for Davey Hamilton, and renumbered it as #36 to make it their primary car. With just 25 practice laps in the car, Harrington got out to qualify at 5:51 p.m. After a quick first lap of 214.061 mph, he crashed heavily in turn 2. Harrington, who was extricated from his car, was awake and alert, and transferred to Methodist Hospital, but was not seriously injured.

Post-qualifying controversy
When the gun sounded at 6 p.m., Lyn St. James and Johnny Unser, teammates at Hemelgarn Racing, were the two drivers bumped out of the starting field. St. James, Unser, as well as Alessandro Zampedri (bumped earlier before managing to re-qualify) had each posted qualifying speeds among the fastest 33 cars and faster than eight of the "locked-in" entries.

USAC officials expressed their concern that, due to the soon-to-be-abandoned 25/8 Rule, the fastest 33 cars were not going to start the race, and a decision was made to reinstate any at-large entries that were bumped, provided they were among the "fastest 33" cars overall. The ruling added St. James and Unser back to the field. They were placed in the 34th and 35th starting positions, respectively.

It was the first time since 1979 that more than the traditional 33 cars constituted the field. The debacle was a public relations black-eye, but the officials were applauded in the media for rightfully adding the cars back to the grid. The 13 rookies that qualified for the race constituted the second highest number since 1930, only behind the previous year's race, with 17. With nine of the 1996 rookies on the field, only 13 drivers had competed in the race before the formation of the IRL.

Carburetion Day

Final practice - Thursday May 22
Tony Stewart turned the fastest lap of the day, at 215.502 mph., while polesitter Arie Luyendyk completed only two laps at speed, using the session mostly as a system check exercise.

Robby Gordon blew an engine, while Dennis Vitolo, Marco Greco and Paul Durant experienced mechanical trouble.

Pit Stop Contest
The Coors Indy Pit Stop Challenge featured eight teams competing for a $40,000 top prize. The Indianapolis 500 pole sitter (Arie Luyendyk) was automatically qualified, and four entries were selected through an "Indy Racing League program" at Walt Disney World (Marco Greco in Scandia's #22; Jim Guthrie in Blueprint's #27) and Phoenix (Davey Hamilton in Foyt's #14; Stéphan Grégoire in Chastain's #77).

The last three places were determined in a preliminary round on May 12, with 7 entries against the clock in a single-run format. Kenny Bräck (with a time of 12.597 seconds), Robby Gordon (13.721 seconds) and Eddie Cheever (14.409 seconds) gained access to the competition, defeating Steve Kinser (14.721 seconds), Jeff Ward (15.447 seconds), Jack Miller (17.245 seconds) and Roberto Guerrero, who failed to register a time. However, both Hamilton and Grégoire's entries were withdrawn by Foyt and Chastain from the competition, allowing Kinser and Ward to take part in the event.

Galles Racing and driver Kenny Bräck defeated Team Cheever with driver/owner Eddie Cheever in the finals.

System check runs
On Saturday May 24, the day before the race, arrangements were made for a special practice session. Due to the new engine package, some teams had requested additional track time for system check runs. A very brief green light period, with a 190 mph speed limit, was conducted for five cars.

Starting grid

 Reinstated to the field by the officials after the close of time trials
 Dropped out during the pace laps, and did not start the race

Alternates
First alternate: #34 - No driver listed (Alessandro Zampedri's primary entry - bumped)

Rain delay

Sunday May 25
The race was originally scheduled for 11 a.m. EST on Sunday May 25. Rain in the morning delayed the activities, but the skies appeared to lighten, and the cars were placed in the grid at 11:45 a.m. At 12 p.m., the skies opened up, and heavy rain began to fall. The cars were wheeled back to the garage area. At 1:30 p.m., track officials rescheduled the race for Monday.

Robby Gordon, driving for Felix Sabates' Team SABCO, had planned on driving the Indy 500/Coca-Cola 600 "Double Duty." At 1:45 p.m., Gordon left the grounds, and flew to Charlotte. The Coca-Cola 600 also suffered a rain delay, but did eventually see the green flag fall. Gordon wrecked out on lap 186, and finished 41st.

Monday May 26

On Memorial Day, Monday May 26, the race was scheduled for 11 a.m. EST. Skies were partly cloudy in the morning, but there was no rain at the time. The pre-race ceremonies were held on-time, but some subtle changes were made. The Purdue Band was unable to return for Monday, and therefore Florence Henderson's rendition of "The Star-Spangled Banner" was done a cappella. In addition, "Taps" was played by a local musician as a substitute. The most noteworthy change, however, was the absence of Jim Nabors. He had left the grounds Sunday night, and was not present to sing the traditional "Back Home Again in Indiana." At his request, a recording from a previous year (1993) was played for the fans. Mari Hulman George followed, officially taking over the family tradition (from her mother Mary F. Hulman) of delivering the starting command. Mary F. Hulman had been inducted into the Auto Racing Hall of Fame earlier in the month, but was in declining health. Also absent was longtime Speedway public address announcer John Totten, who had fallen ill.

On the first parade lap, Dr. Jack Miller got sideways with cold tires and nearly spun in turn 4. He continued, and rejoined the field. On the final pace lap, all three cars of the fifth row, Stéphan Grégoire, Affonso Giaffone, and Kenny Bräck came together in Turn 4, and crashed out of the race. TV replays proved inconclusive to determine the cause of the accident, but a fan recording from the grandstands showed that Bräck had forced down Giaffone, whose left front tyre touched with Grégoire's car, turning him sideways and triggering the 3-car incident. The start, therefore, was delayed by five extra pace laps. Afterwards, Robbie Groff stalled on the backstretch, and Sam Schmidt and Alessandro Zampedri ducked into the pits with mechanical trouble before the race was started. As such, only 30 of the 35 cars on the grid started the race.

Arie Luyendyk led the field to the green flag, but Tony Stewart slipstreamed past him after Turn 4 to lead the first lap. Team Menard would later register an official complaint over Luyendyk's start, after Stewart argued that Luyendyk had tried to crowd him towards the outside wall. During these first laps, Vincenzo Sospiri was overtaken by Robbie Buhl and a fast starting Robby Gordon, who climbed eight spots in only two laps. Jim Guthrie also passed Sospiri and briefly pressured Gordon, but at the end of the sixth lap he pulled into the pits with a sizeable water leak. Also, Eddie Cheever fell down the order after pitting because of a stuck gearbox. On Lap 10, Claude Bourbonnais, running in 26th place, blew his engine, the three Blueprint Racing drivers having fallen by the wayside with mechanical issues despite having worked on their engines the week before the race. Moments after the caution came out, a light drizzle started falling around the track. During the caution, Guthrie's crew frantically tried to fix the leak, but he lost seven laps. On lap 15, the rain started to fall harder, and the race was red flagged.

With rain continuing to fall, the cars returned to the garage area at 12:30 p.m., and fans began to leave the grounds. The race had to go at least 101 laps to be considered official; with only 15 laps completed, the race would have to be resumed. After negotiations between IMS, series officials, and television executives, the decision was made at 2:15 p.m. to resume the race on Lap 16 the following day, Tuesday May 27 at 11 a.m. The arrangement was similar to the one that occurred during the 1973 Indianapolis 500, and differed from a similar situation during the 1986 race. Many expected the conclusion of the race to be postponed until Saturday, May 31, but the officials agreed that, due to the upcoming race at Texas and the good forecast for Tuesday, it was in the best interest to finish the race as soon as possible.

Tuesday May 27
With skies finally clearing, the race finally was able to get underway. Mari Hulman George delivered the "re-start" command at 11 a.m., and the race resumed at lap 16. Of the 35 qualifiers, 29 cars lined up single-file for the restart. The grandstands were only partially full, and it marked the first time since 1973 that the race was held mid-week. ABC-TV made a special arrangement to cover the race live as planned.

Race running

Re-start
The race picked up single-file from the pits at lap 16. The first two laps were run under caution as warm-up laps, however, they counted towards the race total. On lap 18, the green flag came out with Tony Stewart resuming the lead against a very bunched-up field. Robby Gordon was practically alongside Robbie Buhl when the green flag dropped, stripped him of the 3rd place and rapidly closed up on Arie Luyendyk on the backstretch, but he suddenly veered to the warm-up lane in Turn 3, as his engine had caught fire. Gordon jumped out of the car, with his driver's suit burning from leaked methanol in the cockpit, and began rolling vigorously in the grass to put the fire out.

The caution came out, and the car was returned to the pits, with Gordon still willing to drive, but he had to retire from the race with first and second-degree burns on his wrists and right thigh, for which he would miss an entire month of Winston Cup competition. This would eventually lead to Gordon being released at the end of the year, after falling out of grace with Felix Sabates, who weeks later stated that his team would not be back to the Indy 500, being displeased with the attitude of the paddock and the style of Indy car racing.

As the field lined up for the restart on Lap 23, four cars tangled in turn 4. Steve Kinser, up to 10th place, misjudged the procedure and tagged Eliseo Salazar from behind. In the ensuing avoiding measures, Mark Dismore slowed down in 13th place, only to be rear-ended by Roberto Guerrero, retiring on the spot. Salazar and Guerrero would lose laps with extensive repairs, but Kinser only had to replace his front wing. The first significant green flag racing of the week finally began at Lap 28, with Stewart leading Luyendyk and Buhl. Jeff Ward and Buddy Lazier were fourth and fifth in front of Vincenzo Sospiri and Scott Goodyear, having gained two and four positions respectively on the previous restart.

First half
Arie Luyendyk tried to pass Tony Stewart on the inside, but the Team Menard driver kept the lead. The lost momentum allowed Robbie Buhl to pass him in Turn 3, and even Buddy Lazier, who had passed Jeff Ward, had a chance to attack the pole-sitter. Soon after, the top 4 drivers had broken apart from their competitors, with Stewart maintaining a 2-second lead and Luyendyk repassing Buhl on Lap 44. The leaders made their first pit stop around Lap 50, with Team Menard discovering they had no telemetry read from Stewart's car. On Lap 59, Jim Guthrie brought out the yellow, as his engine had finally given up on track. During this caution, Vincenzo Sospiri, who had pitted earlier than anyone else, had to make an unscheduled pit stop because of a malfunctioning fuel alarm. He rejoined in 10th place as the last car in the lead lap, behind Scott Goodyear, Buzz Calkins, a recovering Eddie Cheever and Davey Hamilton.

On the Lap 62 restart, Luyendyk jumped to the front, putting a 4-second lead over Stewart in 13 laps. Buhl and Lazier ran nose-to-tail within 10 seconds of Luyendyk, while the other lead lap drivers had fallen at least 20 seconds behind. Luyendyk made his second pit stop on Lap 79, and a brief issue with the air jack put him behind Stewart, but he reclaimed the lead going around the outside in Turn 1. Buhl, hampered by a failed rear wing change, and Ward also lost places to Lazier and Goodyear, although Lazier could not join the two leaders after being held up by the lapped car of Steve Kinser. During this part of the race, the longest green flag run of the day at 32 laps, Davey Hamilton was lapped, Eddie Cheever had to retire with a broken timing chain, and Buzz Calkins lost two laps after running out of fuel entering the pits.

On Lap 93, a loose brake caliper forced Eliseo Salazar, who was already 23 laps down, to stop the car in Turn 2, bringing out the yellow flag. Robbie Buhl, Vincenzo Sospiri and Jeff Ward pitted for fuel and tires, but Sospiri was shown the black flag for passing Ward under caution. Sospiri served his penalty on Lap 100, but he stopped again four laps later with an electronic coil failure, and spent much of the second half of the race in the pits trying to figure out the issue. By the halfway point, thirteen cars had dropped out, and six stayed on the lead lap, with Billy Boat, Marco Greco, Paul Durant and Davey Hamilton in the top 10.

Second half
The race was restarted at the halfway mark, just one lap before the race became official. Buddy Lazier briefly pressured Tony Stewart, but the latter picked up the pace and caught up to Arie Luyendyk within five laps. Luyendyk made his pit stop on Lap 111, one lap before Stewart and Scott Goodyear, but he had issues again, this time on the left front tyre, and Stewart emerged in front of him after his stop. Buddy Lazier, Robbie Buhl and Jeff Ward, meanwhile, elected to stretch their stints, and their choice initially paid off when the 5th caution of the day came out on Lap 114. From 33rd on the grid, Paul Durant had climbed up to eighth, and was close to teammate Billy Boat, both one lap down from the leaders. In Turn 3, Boat passed Billy Roe, who was two laps down in 14th place, and Durant tried to do the same, but Roe closed the gap, unaware of Durant's presence, and both collided.

Roe emerged unscathed from the heavy impact on the outside wall, but Durant had to be transferred to Methodist Hospital with a fractured pelvis and a concussion. Durant became the third injured driver in Foyt's #1 car during the month of May, after Scott Sharp and Johnny O'Connell. His car kept accelerating when Durant got knocked out, just like Sharp two weeks before. Ward and Lazier made their pit stop under caution, with Ward rejoining between Stewart and Luyendyk, but Lazier ran out of fuel entering the pits and lost half a minute. Surprisingly, Buhl elected not to pit despite being on the same pit sequence as the leaders and, after the '1 to go' signal prevented a late change of mind, he restarted as the race leader. Luyendyk charged again, passing Ward on the restart and Stewart on Lap 128, and inherited the race lead when Buhl pitted four laps later. Trying to navigate through traffic while losing power, Lazier had a heated argument with Marco Greco when the Brazilian held him up, waving angrily at him as he made it past.

The yellow flag was waved again on Lap 138, when Jack Miller, four laps down in 17th place, crashed on Turn 3 after losing control of his car. Running behind Miller, Mike Groff spun trying to avoid him. Groff, the IRL points leader, was running in 18th place, having already lost six laps. Luyendyk, Stewart and Goodyear pitted under caution, leaving Ward and Lazier in front. On the Lap 143 restart, Stewart struck back by passing Luyendyk and Lazier on one lap. Lazier kept dropping back, and was swiftly passed by Luyendyk and Goodyear. Despite his great restart, Stewart suffered from a push condition and lost ground to Ward, falling 7 seconds back on just five laps. Luyendyk eventually took advantage and passed him on Lap 159, with Goodyear closely behind. Six laps later, Tyce Carlson spun in Turn 2 just after being passed by Stewart. The caution ended Buhl's chances, as he had pitted just seconds before, losing a lap to the leaders.

Both Ward and Lazier pitted before anyone else on Lap 166 to gain track position, gambling on a caution-less finish. Luyendyk, Stewart and Goodyear pitted three laps later, but Stewart stalled his car and placed behind Goodyear on the Lap 170 restart. Both were able to pass Luyendyk, who also developed understeer in his car, and Lazier soon became a sitting duck against all three of them on Lap 175. Twenty laps from the end, Stewart passed Goodyear but, five laps later, the slowing car of Buzz Calkins made him go high on the exit of Turn 4, which allowed Goodyear to regain the position. Luyendyk tried to follow his teammate by passing Stewart on the backstretch, but Stewart closed the door on him, forcing Luyendyk to put two wheels on the grass. In this scenario, Goodyear had the potential race lead, given that Ward, who was 13 seconds ahead, needed one final splash-and-go fuel stop before the finish.

Controversial finish
With eleven laps to go, Steve Kinser crashed out of 9th place when his rear left tyre touched with the front right tyre of Buzz Calkins, whom he was lapping on the outside of Turn 4. Lyn St. James, coming from behind after being passed by Kinser, run high trying to avoid him and clipped the wall, damaging a suspension. The ensuing caution flag saw leader Jeff Ward, who knew he could not make it to the finish on fuel, head to the pits, as well as Tony Stewart, who was two gallons short on fuel per his team. With 8 laps left, Scott Goodyear and his teammate Arie Luyendyk led the restart order, followed by Buddy Lazier, while Ward and Stewart had a group of six lapped cars in front. They were the only five drivers on the lead lap.

The green flag came back out on Lap 194, and Luyendyk passed Goodyear on Turn 3 to take the lead. Just two laps later, the yellow was brought out again for debris, as Lazier's right-side rear-view mirror had come loose and was stranded in Turn 2. The Hemelgarn driver was already in 5th place, just trying to make it to the end. Luyendyk led over Goodyear as the green came back out at the conclusion of Lap 197, with three laps to go. As they crossed the start/finish line to complete lap 198, Tony Stewart brushed the wall in turn 4, bending the right-front suspension. Although Stewart had continued, and the car was not seriously damaged, USAC immediately brought out the yellow. The pace car did not enter the track to pick up the leader, as was the normal procedure, and both teams and drivers understood the race would finish under caution, as did IMS Radio Network announcer Bob Jenkins.

As the cars came out of turn four, without any warning, USAC officials suddenly displayed the white and green flag at the starter's stand. The race was back underway for one final lap. The entire field hesitated as the yellow caution lights around the track remained illuminated, unsure if the green flag was an error, and if the conditions were safe to race. Luyendyk obliged the flagstand, dropped a gear, and accelerated into turn, getting a jump on Goodyear and the rest of the field in the process. The yellow lights continued flashing around the track, something Luyendyk noticed on his radio while entering the backstretch, and did not go off until the leaders were nearly at turn 3. The botched restart prevented any significant challenge by Goodyear, and Arie Luyendyk cruised around the final lap to take the victory. It was Luyendyk's second Indy 500 win, becoming the 16th driver to win from the pole position. Luyendyk was emotional in victory lane as he stated:

"I saw the green and white flag wave and I thought 'Hell they better know what they're doing' and I will keep doing what I've been doing. This is a lot better than my first in 1990."

His teammate Scott Goodyear was satisfied but still disappointed at the outcome:

"That's the key lap of the whole race obviously because you want to get a draft, get the guy going and lead coming out the backstretch. I don't think Arie even expected it. Overall a 1-2 finish for Treadway is a bonus but...disappointed that I didn't win."

After brushing the wall late, Tony Stewart limped around on the final lap with a bent suspension arm. After leading the most laps, he held on to finish in 5th place, the last car on the lead lap. It was his best Indy finish, and only career top-five at the Indy 500.

Box score

Standings after the race
Drivers' Championship standings

 Note: Only the top five positions are included for the standings.

Aftermath
After the 25/8 qualifying controversy, rain delays, and bungling of the final lap by the officials, as well as the scrapping of the split-calendar IRL schedule, the 1997 Indy 500 represented a relative low-point for the then-fledgling IRL. The high attrition exposed growing pains for the new chassis and engine formula. The battle of the engine suppliers was completely one-sided, as Oldsmobile dominated, taking the top 11 finishing positions. Infiniti saw no cars in contention during most of the race.

The race also marked the end of the IRL's lucrative initial exclusive contract with ABC Sports, which was not renewed in its entirety. While the Indy 500 itself would remain on ABC, as well as a handful of other races, the IRL would have to complete their TV scheduling with other networks for two and a half years.

The first move to make amends was to drop the 25/8 rule permanently. Two weeks later at Texas Motor Speedway, during the inaugural True Value 500, the increasing dissatisfaction with USAC's officiating hit the boiling point. A malfunction in the electronic scoring system scored Billy Boat as the winner of the race. Meanwhile, Indy 500 winner Arie Luyendyk stormed in victory lane, claiming he was robbed of the victory which led to a physical altercation between him & Boat's car owner A. J. Foyt. The following day, the error was discovered, and was another black mark on USAC's record. Two weeks later, USAC was officially relieved of the duty of sanctioning the IRL, and was replaced by an in-house effort.

On the competition side, Luyendyk became the only driver to win an Indy 500 both before and after the open wheel "split." Luyendyk had previously won the 1990 Indianapolis 500, at a time when most of the field consisted of CART series regulars. Luyendyk also had the distinction of winning the race with both a turbocharged (1990) and a normally aspirated (1997) engine, as well as winning a race with Goodyear and Firestone tires.

In just his second Indy car race, and as a one-off driver, Jeff Ward finished in a remarkable 3rd place, winning Rookie of the Year honours. After battling with Luyendyk for most of the race, Tony Stewart could only finish the race in 5th place, behind Buddy Lazier. Indy car debutant Billy Boat and rookie Robbie Groff also finished in the top-10, with Robbie Buhl in between. With his 12th-place finish, 12 laps down, as the highest Infiniti placed driver, Mike Groff retained the IRL points lead, with a 5-point advantage over Davey Hamilton, who finished sixth.

Broadcasting

Radio
The race was carried live on the IMS Radio Network. Bob Jenkins served as chief announcer for the eighth year. Johnny Rutherford served as "driver expert," and at the start of the race, also drove the pace car. The race was heard on roughly 500 affiliates.

The crew for the 1997 race remained the same from 1996. The broadcast featured rain delay coverage on Sunday, live coverage of the start on Monday, and live coverage of the conclusion on Tuesday. All members of the crew participated on all three days. After serving as a guest booth analyst the previous two years, Chris Economaki spent all three days in the pits as a roving reporter. Economaki conducted interviews and offered observations at various points during the race. In the pit area, Mark Jaynes covered the north pits, Mike King began the race in the center pits, and Vince Welch began the race in the south pits. In the second half of the race, King and Welch shared duties in the south and center pits, focusing on the race leaders.

Television
The race was carried live flag-to-flag coverage in the United States on ABC Sports. Paul Page served as host and play-by-play announcer. Tom Sneva joined the crew, and served as booth analyst. Bobby Unser (turn 2) and Danny Sullivan (turn 4) served as turn reporters, and this would be the final 500 on ABC for both Unser and Sullivan.

The race was scheduled for Sunday May 25, but rain postponed the start. ABC stayed on as scheduled on Sunday, and the broadcast was filled with highlights, interviews, and talk. On Monday May 26, ABC returned to broadcast the race live, preempting regularly scheduled programming. The broadcast came on-air live at 11 EDT, and featured a one-hour pre-race, mirroring the traditional Sunday broadcast format. The race started, but was halted again on lap 15 due to rain. When it was announced that the race would be postponed again, ABC signed off and returned to their regularly scheduled lineup.

On Tuesday May 27, ABC returned once again to air the remainder of the race live. Unlike a similar situation in 1986, officials decided to resume the race on Tuesday, rather than wait until Saturday. ABC again preempted their afternoon lineup, and carried the entire conclusion.
 

Practice and time trials were carried over three networks: ABC, ESPN, and ESPN2. 
Live Daily Reports (ESPN2): Paul Page, Dave Despain, Jon Beekuis, Dr. Jerry Punch, Gary Gerould, Mike King
Time trials (ABC): Paul Page, Tom Sneva, Jack Arute, Gary Gerould
Time trials (ESPN): Dave Despain, Tom Sneva, Jack Arute, Dr. Jerry Punch, Gary Gerould
Time trials (ESPN2): Paul Page, Tom Sneva, Dr. Jerry Punch, Jon Beekuis, Mike King
Carb Day (ESPN): Dave Despain, Jon Beekuis, Dr. Jerry Punch, Mike King
RPM2Day at Indy (ESPN2): Kenny Mayne, Marlo Klain

Gallery

Notes

References

Works cited
1997 Indianapolis 500 Daily Trackside Report for the Media
Indianapolis 500 History: Race & All-Time Stats - Official Site
1997 Indianapolis 500 Radio Broadcast, Indianapolis Motor Speedway Radio Network

Indianapolis 500 races
Indianapolis 500
Indianapolis 500
Indianapolis 500
Indianapolis 500
Indianapolis 500, 1997